Air Commodore John Lewis Mitchell  (November 12, 1918 – February 5, 2016) was a pilot who flew Winston Churchill around the world in his specially fitted aircraft, Ascalon.

Mitchell was born in South Croydon and educated at Bancroft's School. 

During World War II Prime Minister Winston Churchill had flown in RAF and civil aircraft but as the war intensified it was decided that he would fly in special plane codenamed, Ascalon, after the lance with which St George killed the dragon.

Personal life
He married Brenda Stroud in 1943 and they had two sons.

References

 - Total pages: 128

External links 
Memoir by Air Commodore John L Mitchell "The diary of a navigator on the Prime Minister's private aircraft, 1943-5".

1918 births
2016 deaths
Lieutenants of the Royal Victorian Order
Recipients of the Distinguished Flying Cross (United Kingdom)
Recipients of the Air Force Cross (United Kingdom)
Royal Air Force officers